Bad As I Wanna Be: The Dennis Rodman Story is a 1998 American drama film directed by Jean de Segonzac and written by John Miglis and Gar Anthony Haywood. It is based on the 1996 book Bad As I Wanna Be by Dennis Rodman and Tim Keown. The film stars Dwayne Adway, John Terry, Dee Wallace, Heidi Mark, Daniel Hugh Kelly, Art Hindle, Karen Robinson and Michael Caloz. The film premiered on ABC on February 8, 1998.

Plot

The Biographical story of basketball player Dennis Rodman (Dwayne Adway) where he is pushed by his mother to attend college where he would get an opportunity to turn pro. He is shipped to Oklahoma to play for Southeastern under coach Lonn Reisman (Daniel Hugh Kelly) after leading Southeastern to several wins (where he is named the All American Player of the year) he is drafted by Coach Chuck Daly (Art Hindle) of the NBA team the Detroit Pistons.

Cast 
Dwayne Adway as Dennis Rodman
John Terry as James Rich
Dee Wallace as Pat Rich
Heidi Mark as Annie Rodman
Daniel Hugh Kelly as Lonn Reisman
Art Hindle as Chuck Daly
Karen Robinson as Shirley Rodman	
Michael Caloz as Bryne Rich
Terumi Matthews as Madonna
Dennis Rodman as Himself

References

External links
 

1998 television films
1998 films
1990s English-language films
American drama films
1998 drama films
Films directed by Jean de Segonzac
Cross-dressing in television
1990s American films